The 33rd Vehbi Emre & Hamit Kaplan Tournament 2015, was a wrestling event held in Istanbul, Turkey between 4 and 5 January 2015.

This international tournament includes competition men's Greco-Roman wrestling. This ranking tournament was held in honor of the Olympic Champion, Hamit Kaplan and Turkish Wrestler and manager Vehbi Emre.

Medal table

Greco-Roman

Participating nations

References 

Vehbi Emre and Hamit Kaplan
Vehbi Emre and Hamit Kaplan
April 2015 sports events in Turkey
Sports competitions in Istanbul
International wrestling competitions hosted by Turkey
Vehbi Emre & Hamit Kaplan Tournament